Sedlec is a municipality and village in Plzeň-North District in the Plzeň Region of the Czech Republic. It has about 100 inhabitants.

History
The first written mention of Sedlec is from 1193.

References

Villages in Plzeň-North District